USS LST-467 was a United States Navy  used in the Asiatic-Pacific Theater during World War II. As with many of her class, the ship was never named. Instead, she was referred to by her hull designation.

Construction
The ship was laid down on 17 October 1942, under Maritime Commission (MARCOM) contract, MC hull 987, by  Kaiser Shipyards, Vancouver, Washington; launched 21 November 1942; and commissioned on 3 March 1943.

Service history
During World War II, LST-467 was assigned to the Asiatic-Pacific theater. She took part in the Eastern New Guinea operation, the Lae occupation in September 1943; the Bismarck Archipelago operation, the Cape Gloucester, New Britain landings from December 1943 through February 1944; Hollandia operation in April 1944; the Western New Guinea operations, the Toem-Wakde-Sarmi area operation in May 1944, the Biak Islands operation in June 1944, the Noemfoor Island operation in June and July 1944, the Cape Sansapor operation in August 1944, and the Morotai landing in September 1944; the Leyte operation in October and November 1944; the Lingayen Gulf landings in January 1945; the consolidation and capture of the Southern Philippines, the Palawan Island landings in March 1945, the Visayan Island landings in March 1945; and the Borneo operation, the Tarakan Island operation in April and May 1945.

Following the war, LST-467 returned to the United States and was decommissioned on 28 May 1946, and struck from the Navy list on 5 June 1946. On 22 November 1946, the tank landing ship was sold to the National Metal & Steel Corp., Terminal Island, California.

She was later resold to the St. Charles Transportation Co., which was a subsidiary of Anglo Canadian Pulp and Paper Mills, of Montreal, Quebec. She was modified by Davie Shipbuilding & Repairing Co., of Lauzon, Quebec, for use as a log hauler.

She was later either renamed Ampower Corp or was bought by Ampower Corp before being renamed Frank J. Humphrey. By 1984, she was owned by the West Indies Trading Company, renamed WIT Shoal II and was being used as an inter island freighter in the Caribbean. On 6 November 1984, she was in Krum Bay, near Charlotte Amalie West, U.S. Virgin Islands, when she was wrecked by Tropical Storm Klaus. She was later patched and raised so she could be towed to Puerto Rico for scrapping. In May 1985, while being towed to Puerto Rico, one of the patches broke loose and the tow lines had to be cut.

Honors and awards
LST-467 earned eight battle stars for her World War II service.

Notes

Citations

Bibliography 

Online resources

External links

 

1942 ships
World War II amphibious warfare vessels of the United States
LST-1-class tank landing ships of the United States Navy
S3-M2-K2 ships
Ships built in Vancouver, Washington